Neptis goochii, the small streaked sailer, is a butterfly of the family Nymphalidae. It is found in Sub-Saharan Africa. The habitat consists of forests.

Wingspan is 30–35 mm in males and 34–38 mm in females. Adults are on the wing year round with a peak from December to May.

The larvae feed on Acalypha species, as well as Alchornea cordifolia and Dalbergia species.

References

Butterflies described in 1879
goochi
Butterflies of Africa
Taxa named by Roland Trimen